The 424th Reconnaissance Group is an inactive United States Air Force unit. Its last assignment was with Third Air Force, based at DeRidder Army Airbase, Louisiana. It was inactivated on 15 August 1943.

The group was constituted on 30 March 1943 and activated on 1 April. The 35th, 36th, 37th and 38th Reconnaissance Squadrons were assigned. However, the unit was never fully organized. Disbanded on 15 August 1943.

References

 Maurer, Maurer (1983). Air Force Combat Units of World War II. Maxwell AFB, Alabama: Office of Air Force History. .

External links

Reconnaissance groups of the United States Army Air Forces
Military units and formations established in 1943